Harry Alcock was a footballer who played in the Football League for Walsall. He was born in Walsall, England.

References

English footballers
Walsall F.C. players
English Football League players
1905 births
Year of death missing
Sportspeople from Walsall
Association football outside forwards